Wank may refer to:

 WANK (computer worm), a computer worm that attacked DEC VAX/VMS systems through DECnet in 1989
 WXTY, a radio station (99.9 FM) licensed to serve Lafayette, Florida, United States, which held the call sign WANK from 2010 to 2018
 Wank (mountain), a German mountain close to the Austrian border
 Masturbation, in British slang
 Wank (surname), a surname

See also
 Wanka (disambiguation)
 Wankel (surname)
 Wanker (disambiguation)